This is a list of notable events that occurred in 2020 in Qatar.

Incumbents 

 Emir: Tamim bin Hamad Al Thani

Events

February 
 27 February - The first case in COVID-19 the country was confirmed.

July 

 14 July - The International Court of Justice rules in favor of Qatar, rejecting an appeal by Bahrain, Saudi Arabia, Egypt and the United Arab Emirates (UAE), allowing the International Civil Aviation Organization (ICAO) to determine the legality of a 2017 package of sanctions which included air blockades.

References 

 
Years of the 21st century in Qatar
Qatar
Qatar
2020s in Qatar